Moshe Spitzer was an Israeli typographer and artist.

Biography 
Moshe Spitzer, painter, graphic artist, typographer, born 1900, Moravia. Educated at Kiel University and taught in Europe and Israel. Pioneered fine Hebrew books and founded "Tarshish" Publications. Founded school of typography and designed many important fonts of modern Hebrew lettering. The font work done by Spitzer was much acclaimed as can be seen in the Penrose Journal of 1972. Died 1983.

Education 
 1922–26 Kiel University, Department of Oriental Studies

Teaching 
 1926 Royal Prussian Academy of Sciences, Research assistant.
 1932 Assistant to Martin Buber in the German translation of the Hebrew Bible

References

External links 
 Moshe Spitzer from the collections of the Israel Museum Spitzer&Submit=Search
 Moshe Spitzer from the Israeli artist list of the Information Center for Israeli Art at the Israel Museum 
 Europeana – Search results Spitzer%22 Europeana -- Moshe Spitzer
 Moshe Spitzer and Lambert Schneider 

1900 births
1983 deaths
Israeli artists
Israeli typographers and type designers
Romanian emigrants to Mandatory Palestine